Valleys & Cardiff Local Routes (formerly Valley Lines) is the network of passenger suburban railway services radiating from Cardiff, Wales. It includes lines within the city itself, the Vale of Glamorgan and the South Wales Valleys.

The services are currently operated by Transport for Wales Rail. In total, it serves 81 stations in six unitary authority areas: 20 in the city of Cardiff, 11 in the Vale of Glamorgan, 25 in Rhondda Cynon Taf, 15 in Caerphilly, 8 in Bridgend and 5 in Merthyr Tydfil.

Services on these routes are provided by Class 150 DMUs and Class 769 bi-mode multiple units in Diesel mode. They are typically end-to-end, in that they run from one branch terminus, through Cardiff Queen Street station, to another branch terminus, e.g. from Pontypridd to Barry Island.

History

Airport and Llantwit Major. These services were originally advertised to start in April 2005, but commenced on 12 June 2005. Previously services only went as far as Barry.

On 28 March 2020, ownership of the lines between Cardiff and Treherbert, Aberdare, Merthyr Tydfil, Coryton, Rhymney and Cwmbargoed (the "Core Valley Lines") was transferred from Network Rail to Transport for Wales, who leased them to operator AKIL.

Electrification

On 16 July 2012 the UK Government announced plans to extend the electrification of the network at a cost of £350 million. This was at the same time of the announcement of electrification of the South Wales Main Line from Cardiff to Swansea. This would also see investment in new trains and continued improvements to stations.

The investment will require new trains and should result in reduced journey times and cheaper maintenance of the network. Work was expected to start between 2014 and 2019, but has since been pushed back to between 2019 and 2024.

Lines

The colours used below are from the official network map (see External links). Stations in bold are major interchanges for the network.

Routes
Generally trains run from one line to another, joining at Cardiff Central eliminating the need for changing trains there. However they may not run for the whole length of the line. Services run between:
Bridgend/Barry Island and Merthyr Tydfil/Aberdare - incorporating the Vale of Glamorgan and Merthyr Lines
Penarth and Rhymney/Bargoed - incorporating the Vale of Glamorgan and Rhymney Lines
Radyr and Coryton - incorporating the City and Coryton Lines
Cardiff Central and Treherbert - incorporating the Rhondda Line only
Cardiff Queen Street and Cardiff Bay - incorporating the Butetown Branch Line only

Surrounding lines
The following lines also serve Cardiff and the South Wales Valleys but are not considered part of the network by Transport for Wales and use more "mainline" rolling stock (currently Class 170 units).

See also
South East Wales Metro
Rail transport in Cardiff
List of Valley Lines stations
List of railway stations in Wales

References

External links
 Route map – Transport for Wales
 Arriva Trains Wales
 Descriptions of the Valley Lines – Deryck Lewis, archived in 2005

Railway lines in Wales
Standard gauge railways in Wales
Rail transport in Cardiff